Hemipilia henryi is an endangered species of plant in the family Orchidaceae native to the Hubei  and Sichuan provinces of China.

References

Flora of Hubei
Flora of Sichuan
Endemic orchids of China
henryi
Endangered plants
Plants described in 1896
Taxonomy articles created by Polbot